was a town located in Katō District, Hyōgo Prefecture, Japan.

As of 2003, the town had an estimated population of 11,807 and a density of 597.22 persons per km². The total area was 19.77 km².

On March 20, 2006, Takino, along with the towns of Tōjō and Yashiro (all from Katō District), was merged to create the city of Katō.

Takino's former sister city was Hollister, California.

External links
Takino official website in Japanese

Dissolved municipalities of Hyōgo Prefecture
Katō, Hyōgo